Chester Rogers Covington (November 6, 1910 – June 11, 1976) was a Major League Baseball pitcher who played for the Philadelphia Phillies in 1944. The 33-year-old rookie, recipient of The Sporting News Minor League Player of the Year Award in 1943, was a native of Cairo, Illinois.

Covington is one of many ballplayers who only appeared in the major leagues during World War II. He made his major league debut on April 23, 1944, in a doubleheader against the Boston Braves at Braves Field. His first and only major-league win was in the first game of a doubleheader against the Braves at Shibe Park on April 30, 1944. He pitched in relief and was the pitcher of record in a 14-inning, 2–1 victory.

For the season, part of which was spent in the minor leagues, he appeared in 19 games, all in relief, and had a 1–1 record with 10 games finished. He allowed 20 earned runs in 38 innings pitched for a final ERA of 4.66. In addition, Covington pitched 15 seasons in minor league baseball, winning minor league 220 games.

Covington died at the age of 65 in Pembroke Park, Florida.

References

External links

The Deadball Era

1910 births
1976 deaths
Philadelphia Phillies players
Major League Baseball pitchers
Baseball players from Illinois
People from Cairo, Illinois
Portsmouth Cubs players
Jacksonville Tars players
Springfield Rifles players
Birmingham Barons players
Louisville Colonels (minor league) players
Scranton Red Sox players
Utica Blue Sox players
Chattanooga Lookouts players
Tampa Smokers players
Montgomery Rebels players
Miami Tourists players
Fort Lauderdale Braves players
Greensboro Patriots players
Lakeland Pilots players
Fort Lauderdale Lions players
Port Chester Clippers players